The Journey Continues may refer to:

 The Journey Continues (Bradley Joseph album), 2003
 The Journey Continues (Tommy Emmanuel album), 1994 re-release of The Journey
 The Journey Continues, an album by Djabe and Steve Hackett, 2021
 The Journey Continues, an album by Journey, 2001
 "The Journey Continues", a song by Mark Brown, featuring Sarah Cracknell, 2007

See also 
 Journey Continued, a 1988 autobiography by Alan Paton